Hi Cousin! is a 1996 Algerian comedy film directed by Merzak Allouache. The film was selected as the Algerian entry for the Best Foreign Language Film at the 69th Academy Awards, but was not accepted as a nominee.

Cast
 Gad Elmaleh as Alilo
 Messaoud Hattau as Mok (as Mess Hattou)
 Magaly Berdy as Fatoumata
 Ann-Gisel Glass as Laurence
 Jean Benguigui as Maurice
 Xavier Maly as Claude

See also
 List of submissions to the 69th Academy Awards for Best Foreign Language Film
 List of Algerian submissions for the Academy Award for Best Foreign Language Film

References

External links
 

1996 films
1996 comedy films
1990s Arabic-language films
1990s French-language films
Films directed by Merzak Allouache
Algerian comedy films
1996 multilingual films
Algerian multilingual films